Tracy Jones Akiror (born 25 August 1997), known as Tracy Jones, is a Ugandan footballer who plays as a midfielder for USL W League club AFC Ann Arbor and the Uganda women's national team.

Early life
Jones was born at the Mulago National Specialised Hospital. She was raised in Luzira–Kirombe, within Kampala.

College career
Jones has attended the Seminole State College (Oklahoma) and the Lindsey Wilson College in the United States.

Club career
Jones has played for Kawempe Muslim Ladies FC in Uganda.

International career
Jones represented Uganda at the 2014 African U-20 Women's World Cup Qualifying Tournament. At senior level, she played the 2018 COSAFA Women's Championship.

International goals
Scores and results list Uganda's goal tally first

References

External links

1997 births
Living people
Sportspeople from Kampala
Ugandan women's footballers
Women's association football midfielders
Seminole State Trojans athletes
College women's soccer players in the United States
Lindsey Wilson Blue Raiders women's soccer players
Uganda women's international footballers
Ugandan expatriate women's footballers
Ugandan expatriate sportspeople in the United States
Expatriate women's soccer players in the United States